Tom Brennan (June 4, 1928 – January 25, 2013) was an Oklahoma Secretary of Administration and Director of Purchasing in the Cabinet of Governor Frank Keating. Prior to this, he had worked as an engineer for General Electric, Vice President of Engineering for Warner Electric Brake and Clutch, and as President and CEO for Oil Dynamics, Inc.

References

1928 births
2013 deaths
General Electric employees
State cabinet secretaries of Oklahoma